The 2016 Desert Diamond Cup was a soccer exhibition featuring six soccer teams from Major League Soccer, two from the United Soccer League and host FC Tucson from the Premier Development League, held from February 17 to February 27, 2016. It is the 6th annual Desert Diamond Cup.

Teams 
The following nine clubs participated in the 2016 tournament:
New England Revolution (fifth appearance)
Real Salt Lake (fifth appearance)
FC Tucson (fourth appearance)
Colorado Rapids (third appearance)
Sporting Kansas City (third appearance)
Arizona United SC (first appearance)
Columbus Crew SC (first appearance)
Houston Dynamo (first appearance)
Swope Park Rangers (first appearance)

Table standings

Matches
The tournament featured a round-robin group stage followed by fifth-place, third-place and championship matches.

Tournament

Finals

Goalscorers

Top scorers

Awards
CARF International MVP: Teal Bunbury (NEW}
TEP Copper Boot (Leading Scorer): Kei Kamara (COL}

References 

2016
Desert Diamond Cup
Desert Diamond